Electronicat is the alter ego of French musician and performer Fred Bigot, whose work is characterized by its constant switch between experimental noise and pop music.

His early collaborations include work with Kasper T. Toeplitz on the project "Sleaze Art", work with various choreographers (e.g. Sylvain Prunenec), theatre directors (Celia Houdart) and artists (e.g. Cecile Babiole).

From 1997 until 2000 he collaborated with visual artist Cecile Babiole on an audio/visual show "Hot Spectrum", playing at festivals such as Phonotaktik in Vienna or FCMM in Montréal, after which he decided to perform solo. Combining samples of his own voice with guitars, analogue synthesizers and drum machine loops he created a pounding, fuzzy, wah-wah distorted psychedelic electro sound.

In this context he decided to work together with other internationally renowned electronic music producers, such as Gerhard Potuznik and Patrick Pulsinger and employ the vocal skills of other musicians such as Khan (Captain Comatose), Catriona Shaw (Queen of Japan) and J. G. Thirlwell. Alongside this, he maintained activity in the experimental music circuit.
He has released on a plethora of labels from Disko B to current London newcomer 'UpperCuts', has remixed numerous underground (e.g. Schlammpeitziger) and mainstream (e.g. Depeche Mode) musicians. In turn he has also been remixed by artists such as Zbigniew Karkowski, Kid 606 and other musicians on the electronic music circuit.

Discography

Albums
 Chez Toi, Disko B, 2007
 Voodoo Man, Disko B, 2005
 21st Century Toy, Disko B, 2003
 Birds Want to Have Fun, Angelika Koehlermann, 2002
 Cat a tac, Oni.Tor, 2001
 So I Love You, Noise Museum, 2000
 Electronicat, Noise Museum, 1999

Singles
 "Dans les Bois", Disko B, 2004
 "Frisco Bay", Disko B, 2003
 "Amour Sale", Disko B, 2002
 "Shuffle Tiiiime", Alice in Wonder, 2000

Remixes
Life Less Machine, (Cato Canari), Jet Set Records, 2007
My Baby Don't Care, (One-Two), Uppercuts, 2006
Jealousy, (Miss le Bomb), Careless Records, 2006
Loved But Not Fired, (Brezel Göring), Surprise, 2005
Keiren, (Shinto), Echokammer, 2004
America, (Boy from Brazil), Transsolar, 2004
Fast food messiah, (Junesex), Pop up, 2004
Prä-Frag Behäbige..., (Schlammpeitziger), Sonig, 2004
Baby, (Captain Comatose), Playhouse, 2004
We Got The Horror, (The Emergency), Feral Media, 2004
Alles ist da, (Mense Reents), Ladomat, 2003
Driving song, (Numbers), Tigerbeat6, 2002
Plugin city universe, (Valvola), S.H.A.D.O., 2002
Soft Wah War, (H.P vs A.Laplantine), Doxa, 2002
Spitcat, (Beefcake), M-tronic, 2002
The Dead of Night, (Depeche Mode), Mute, 2002

Compilation appearances
Chez Toi, Echokammer Werkschau, Echokammer, 2008
Lost Gigabyte, Pudel Produkte Vier, Nobistor, 2006
Wop Doowop, The Trip Curated By Jarvis Cocker, Family Records, 2006
Where were you...?, Freestyle Candies Vol.2, Klang Elektronik, 2006
Keiren, Disko Cabine, Lou Records, 2005
Flesh & Accessories, Electric Pop 4, MOFA 2005
Bolantronic, The Other Side, New York Breakbeat, 2005
Till I Die, Colette No. 5, Colette, 2003
Frisco Bay, Electro Rock, Wagram, 2003
Frisco Bay, Nag Nag Nag, React, 2003
Amour Sale, French Sounds Catalogue, 2002
Shuffle Tiiiime, Martin Gore DJ Set, Mute, 2001
Ecatloop, Lockers ERS 2000
Shuffle Time, Schaffelfieber, Kompakt, 2000

External links and references
Official site
Electronicat on All Music
Electronicat on Forced Exposure
Site as Fred Bigot
Myspace page
Disko B label page
Electronicat interview
Electronicat reviewed on Staalplaat
Electronicat on Discogs
Electronicat on Laut.de (German site)
Short German interview on curt.de
Electronicat Review in FutureMusic p.87, Issue 135

Year of birth missing (living people)
Living people
French musicians